The simple Simon under bend is a knot belonging to the category bend. The knot is based on the Reef knot. It was invented by Harry Asher. It is more secure than the similar simple Simon over. The difference is just which of the green ends in the image below is the standing end.

The simple Simon under holds well even with different sized ropes, or slippery synthetic ropes.

Instructions

See also
 Knot
 List of bend knots
 List of knots

References

Bend knots
Knots of modern origin